Pareutaenia is a genus of longhorn beetles of the subfamily Lamiinae, containing the following species:

 Pareutaenia arnaudi Breuning, 1962
 Pareutaenia flavostellata Breuning, 1948

References

Lamiini